"When I'm Up (I Can't Get Down)" is a song written by English folk rock group Oysterband and later made famous in Canada by Newfoundlander folk rock band Great Big Sea.  It first appeared as track 1 on Oysterband's 1993 album Holy Bandits. It was released in May 1997 as the lead single from Great Big Sea's Play. It peaked at No. 13 on the Canadian RPM adult contemporary chart and at No. 6 on the Canadian RPM Top Singles, making it their highest peaking song on the Top Singles chart.

Chart performance

Weekly charts

Year-end charts

References

1997 singles
Great Big Sea songs
Music videos directed by Andrew MacNaughtan
1993 songs
Warner Records singles